Flavihumibacter cheonanensis is a Gram-negative, rod-shaped, strictly aerobic and non-motile bacterium from the genus of Flavihumibacter which has been isolated from a shallow stream from Cheonan in Korea.

References

Chitinophagia
Bacteria described in 2014